This is a list of Members of Parliament (MPs) elected to the House of Commons of the United Kingdom by Northern Irish constituencies for the Fifty-Fifth Parliament of the United Kingdom (2010 to 2015).

It includes both MPs elected at the 2010 general election, held on 6 May 2010, and those subsequently elected in by-elections.

The list is sorted by the name of the MP, and MPs who did not serve throughout the Parliament are italicised. New MPs elected since the general election are noted at the bottom of the page.

Sinn Féin MPs choose not to take up their seats in the House of Commons.

Current composition

MPs

By-elections
 2011 Belfast West by-election
 2013 Mid Ulster by-election

See also
 2010 United Kingdom general election
 List of MPs elected in the 2010 United Kingdom general election
 List of MPs for constituencies in England 2010–15
 List of MPs for constituencies in Scotland 2010–15
 List of MPs for constituencies in Wales 2010–15
 :Category:UK MPs 2010–2015

References

Northern Ireland
2010-15
MPs
2010s elections in Northern Ireland